Claudia Anne Hammond (born 23 May 1971) is a British author, TV presenter, and frequent radio presenter on the BBC World Service and BBC Radio 4.

Early life
Hammond was born in the market town of Biggleswade in Bedfordshire on 23 May 1971, and grew up in the county.

Education
Hammond was educated at Dame Alice Harpur School (a former independent school for girls in Bedford that is now part of Bedford Girls' School), which she left in 1989. She then studied applied psychology at the University of Sussex, moving on to the University of Surrey, where she gained an MSc in health psychology, carrying out research into doctor–patient communication in a breast cancer unit.

Career

Author
Hammond is the author of four books, including Mind Over Money: the psychology of money and how to use it better, published in May 2016 by Canongate Books. The Telegraph newspaper described this as: "Part fascinating psychological exploration, part practical guide - exposing the myriad ways money messes with our heads and suggesting means by which we might get a handle on it".

Her first book, Emotional Rollercoaster, published in 2005, was on the science of emotions. Reviews were positive; one said that although it contained "rare errors" these mistakes are "vastly outweighed by the wealth of fascinating observations", and that "humour, sensitivity and warmth... emanate from every page".

Hammond's second book, Time Warped: Unlocking the Mysteries of Time Perception, was published by Canongate in May 2012. The Financial Times called it "a fascinating and at times mind-boggling book that will change the way you think about time".

In 2019, Canongate published her book The Art of Rest. The book draws on research from "The Rest Test", the largest global survey into rest, which was completed by 18,000 people across 135 different countries.

Radio presenter
Hammond has said that her decision to attempt to work in radio came early in her life and quite suddenly. "I was at a children's book festival and, after I had queued up to get Roald Dahl's autograph, he asked me what I wanted to do when I grew up. I'm told I said "I want to work in radio". That was the first my parents knew about it. It was probably the first time I realised." She presents programmes about psychology on BBC Radio 4, including All in the Mind. She also presents Health Check on BBC World Service Radio. In 2020, she presented Inside Health – the Virus, a version of Inside Health in the wake of the coronavirus 2020 pandemic. In October 2020, she presented the BBC Radio 4 programme The Touch Test, analysing results of a survey into the sense of touch. She also presented a 1: 45 programme called The Anatomy of Touch.

In March 2022, she presented the Radio 4 programme The Anatomy of Kindness, dealing with the results of the Kindness Test, a survey in which 60,000 respondents completed a questionnaire asking about human kindness.

TV presenter
In addition to presenting Health Check on BBC World News every Friday, Hammond has appeared on several other TV programmes (such as The One Show and BBC Breakfast) commenting on psychological topics. In the past, as a reporter, she covered science and medical issues for Channel 5 News.

Journalistic philosophy
Hammond has said she tries to "give people a better understanding of the role psychology plays. Helping people articulate and get across a seemingly technical piece of good research is central to my approach. I also like bringing different specialists together – it's amazing how often people who are hugely expert in one area of psychology know next to nothing about related work in a slightly different field."

Despite her varied portfolio, Hammond gave 'be choosy' as a piece of careers advice in one interview:

"Popular programmes are fine – "I sometimes go on Richard & Judy to talk about psychological research – but if I think a show is going to dumb it down, I say no. And sometimes what they’re looking for is a qualified therapist, and that’s not me."

Awards and nominations

References

External links
 
 Claudia Hammond homepage
 BBC World Service presenter profile (including a video).
 Emotional Rollercoaster on ISBNDb
 Review of Emotional Rollercoaster in The Independent

1971 births
Living people
Alumni of the University of Surrey
Alumni of the University of Sussex
BBC newsreaders and journalists
BBC Radio 4 presenters
BBC World Service people
British journalists
British radio presenters
British women psychologists
British women television journalists
English psychologists
People educated at Dame Alice Harpur School
People from Bedfordshire
People from Biggleswade
Recipients of the President's Medal (British Academy)
British women radio presenters